Elery "Ed" Guy Greathouse (October 26, 1899 – 1954) was an American boxer who competed in the 1924 Summer Olympics in Paris. He was born in Roane County, West Virginia.

At the 1924 Olympic tournament Greathouse was eliminated in the second round of the heavyweight class after losing his fight to the eventual bronze medalist Alfredo Porzio of Argentina.

References

External links
Ed Greathouse's profile at Sports Reference.com

1899 births
1954 deaths
Boxers from West Virginia
Heavyweight boxers
Olympic boxers of the United States
Boxers at the 1924 Summer Olympics
People from Roane County, West Virginia
American male boxers